Chen Jiadong (born August 1959) is a former Chinese politician who spent his entire career in southwest China's Fujian province. He was investigated by China's top anti-graft agency in February 2022. Previously he served as chairman and party branch secretary  of the Standing Committee of the Xiamen Municipal People's Congress, and before that, party secretary of Zhangzhou.

He was a delegate to the 11th and 13th National People's Congress. He was a member of the 9th and 10th CCP Fujian Provincial Committee.

Biography
Chen was born in Changle County (now Changle District of Fuzhou), Fujian, in August 1959. He entered the workforce in September 1981, and joined the Chinese Communist Party (CCP) in April 1986.

He joined the Fujian Provincial Forestry Department in October 1995 and two years later was promoted to become its deputy director. In April 2005, he was named party secretary of Fu'an, his first foray into a municipal leadership role. In June 2007, he was promoted to acting mayor of Ningde, confirmed in December. In April 2010, he was recalled to the original Fujian Provincial Forestry Department as director. In August 2013, he was appointed party secretary of Zhangzhou, the top political position in the city, he remained in that position until December 2016, when he was transferred to Xiamen and appointed chairman and party branch secretary of the People's Congress.

Downfall
On 25 February 2022, he has been placed under investigation for "serious violations of discipline and laws" by the Central Commission for Discipline Inspection (CCDI), the party's internal disciplinary body, and the National Supervisory Commission, the highest anti-corruption agency of China. On August 30, he was expelled from the CCP and dismissed from public office.

References

1959 births
Living people
People from Fuzhou
Mayors of Ningde
Central Party School of the Chinese Communist Party alumni
People's Republic of China politicians from Fujian
Chinese Communist Party politicians from Fujian
Delegates to the 11th National People's Congress
Delegates to the 13th National People's Congress